Matthieu Delpierre (born 26 April 1981 in Nancy, France) is a retired French footballer who played as a centre back.

Delpierre's professional career started with Lille OSC, before a move to VfB Stuttgart in Germany where he eventually became the club captain. Delpierre spent eight years at Stuttgart before moving on to TSG 1899 Hoffenheim, then FC Utrecht and ended his career in Australia with Melbourne Victory FC

He represented France at U18, U20 and under-21 level, making appearances during the 2002 UEFA European Under-21 Football Championship.

Club career

Lille
In his first season with Lille, Delpierre made few appearances but helped in the club's promotion to Ligue 1. Delpierre played more regularly in his second season, helping Lille finish third and thereby qualify for the UEFA Champions League. Delpierre continued to perform well for Lille though the club finished at a lower position in the league every season.

Stuttgart
Delpierre was signed by VfB Stuttgart on a free transfer after Lille refused to grant him a contract extension. Stuttgart struggled during the 2004–05 and 2005–06 seasons, but Delpierre began to improve under the tutelage of coach Armin Veh.

The following season, during which he missed only one game through illness, the French defender formed an almost impenetrable barrier alongside Fernando Meira at the heart of the Stuttgart defence. Matthieu has also been a vital cog in Stuttgart's success in the 2006–07 DFB-Pokal, in which the team conceded only three goals before losing the final to Nürnberg. On 19 May 2007, Delpierre won the German Bundesliga with Stuttgart, playing a significant part in their success.

His defensive performances attracted the attention of Arsenal and Bayern Munich and also French clubs Marseille and Saint-Étienne.  However, he remained at Stuttgart, extending his contract until the summer of 2012.

On 1 December 2009, Delpierre was appointed the new captain of VfB Stuttgart by Markus Babbel. On 12 January 2012 he asked Bruno Labbadia to appoint another player.

Delpierre joined Hoffenheim on a free transfer at the end of the 2011–12 season. He spent 18 months with Hoffenheim before moving to FC Utrecht in January 2014.

Move to Australia
On 7 July 2014, A-League club Melbourne Victory announced the signing of Delpierre on a one-year deal.

On 10 October 2014, Delpierre scored the first goal of the 2014–15 A-League season in the Victory's first round match against the Western Sydney Wanderers, scoring from a Guilherme Finkler free kick in just the 8th minute of the match. The Victory eventually won the match 4–1.

On 1 May 2015, Delpierre extended his contract with Melbourne Victory for one more year.

Delpierre made 53 appearances in all competitions for the Victory during his two seasons in the A-League, scoring once.

On 26 April 2016, Delpierre announced his retirement from professional football at the age of 35, having completed 17 seasons since his debut with Lille in 1999.

International career
Delpierre was called up to the senior France team in March 2008 but was ultimately never capped at that level.

Honours

Club
Lille
 Ligue 2: 1999–2000

Stuttgart
 Bundesliga: 2006–07

Melbourne Victory
 A-League Championship: 2014–15
 A-League Premiership: 2014–15
 FFA Cup: 2015

Individual
 PFA Team of the Season: 2014–15, 2015–16
 Victory Medal: 2015–16
 Players' Player of the Year: 2015–16

References

External links
 Matthieu Delpierre at Stuttgart's official website
 Matthieu Delpierre at Eurosport
 
 Voetbal International profile 

1981 births
Living people
French footballers
France under-21 international footballers
France youth international footballers
FC Nantes players
Lille OSC players
VfB Stuttgart II players
VfB Stuttgart players
TSG 1899 Hoffenheim players
FC Utrecht players
Melbourne Victory FC players
Association football fullbacks
Ligue 1 players
Ligue 2 players
Bundesliga players
3. Liga players
Eredivisie players
A-League Men players
French expatriate footballers
Expatriate footballers in Germany
Expatriate footballers in the Netherlands
Expatriate soccer players in Australia